Zhenghe or Zheng He may refer to:

People
Zheng He (1371–1433), Ming dynasty admiral and explorer
Zheng He (general) (1958–), general of the People's Liberation Army

Science and technology
ZhengHe (spacecraft), planned asteroid and comet exploration mission
Type 679 training ship, Chinese training ship
ROCS Cheng Ho (PFG2-1103), one of Taiwanese-built Cheng Kung-class frigates of the Republic of China Navy

Locations
Zhenghe County, county in Fujian, China
Zhenghe, Hunan (正和), town in Guiyang County, Hunan, China
Zhenghe Township (郑河), township in Zhuanglang County, Gansu, China

Historical eras
Zhenghe (征和, 92–89 BC), an era name of Emperor Wu of Han
Zhenghe (政和, 1111–1118), an era name of Emperor Huizong of Song